Walter Nurnberg   (April 18, 1907 – 19 October 1991) was one of post-war Britain's outstanding industrial photographers.

Life before the Second World War
He was brought up in Berlin. Originally, he hoped to become a musician, but later he turned towards advertising instead. He began studying photography in 1930 at the Reimann School in Berlin. On graduating, he took a job at a Berlin advertising agency. He learned fast and applied the Bauhaus-influenced lighting principles he had studied at the school.

He moved to England in 1933 and opened his own advertising studio in London. His first big assignment was to advertise GPO greetings telegrams. With a good command of spoken and written English, Nurnberg’s intellectual powers soon led him to write articles for trade magazines, in which he effectively conveyed his philosophy of photography.

Later he joined Kraszna-Krausz's stable of writers at the Focal Press. Ultimately, however, he became one of post-war Britain's outstanding industrial photographers, applying a modernistic, sometimes abstract vision to the representation of objects and processes. His book 'Lighting for Photography: Means and Methods' was first published in 1940. It remains a classic to date.

In 1937, when the Reimann School was driven out of Germany by the Nazis, it re-established itself in London. Here, Nurnberg became a part-time teacher.

Shooting a series of stirring portraits of servicemen and women entitled 'The Fighting Face of Britain' for a Sunday newspaper, his images proved to be the opening salvos in his battle to change the face of British photography.

With the declaration of war in September 1939, Nurnberg became an enemy alien in Britain and his cameras were confiscated. They were returned to him in 1940. However, Nurnberg was made an 'honorary Briton' and served in the Army until 1944, when he was invalided out on medical grounds.

Life after the war
After the Second World War, Nurnberg saw the coming changes in manufacturing and became an outstanding industrial photographer, his style taking into consideration the design and function of his subjects. Rebuilding his career, Nurnberg became a naturalised British subject in 1947. Taking industry as his subject, he used a Rolliflex 6 cm x 6 cm twin-lens camera and tungsten lighting, employing his powerful personality to single-handedly change the depressed attitudes of run down, near bankrupt post-war British industry. He was often heard to remark, "I have not touched a 35mm camera since I reached puberty."

His books on lighting for Focal Press had become industrial standards for years to come, whilst his photographs commanded high fees and even higher accolades. Particularly memorable were the covers of Engineering, a glossy Design Council magazine, in which his dramatically lit images appeared regularly for fifteen years.

In 1968 he became head of Photography at the Guildford School of Art, later part of the West Surrey College of Art and Design, and was plunged immediately into troubled waters. The Photography Department was fashion- and reportage-inclined whereas Nürnberg was an industrial photographer. At that time, many students resented the incompetence of the Photography Department and engaged in sit-ins and strikes, but Nurnberg, through his rigour, eventually demonstrated his worth. He taught at Polytechnic of Central London and among his students were the likes of Chris Cook in 1974. His teaching was inspirational majoring on the philosophy and psychology of photography.

Legacy
The value of Nurnberg’s contribution to 20th century photography is twofold. Firstly, by doggedly sticking to his lighting principles, creating memorable black and white images for the printed page he did much to boost the image and confidence of British industry. More importantly, his work challenged and inspired those who followed. The best of them have sought and found new creative ways to convey the vitality and power of the fast-changing face of world industry.

For three decades, the industrial images of Walter Nurnberg were a benchmark and challenge to every other photographer in the field.

Nurnberg received an O.B.E. for his contribution to industrial photography and photographic education.

References

Photographers from London
1907 births
1991 deaths
Photographers from Berlin
Reimann School (Berlin) alumni
Industrial photographers
Officers of the Order of the British Empire
Emigrants from Nazi Germany to the United Kingdom